The Partido de Lincoln is a partido of Buenos Aires Province in Argentina. It is located in the northwestern part of the province, in central Argentina. 

Settlements
 Arenaza
 Balsa
 Bayauca
 Bermúdez
 Carlos Salas
 Coronel Martínez de Hoz
 El Triunfo
 Fortín Vigilancia
 Las Toscas
 Lincoln
 Pasteur
 Roberts
 Triunvirato

Name
When the partido was founded in 1865, the name Lincoln was chosen as a tribute to the recently assassinated Abraham Lincoln, 16th President of the United States (1861 to 1865), and enactor of the Emancipation Proclamation.

Economy
Lincoln's economy is dominated by agriculture. The main crops are wheat, corn, soy and sunflower. The district is home to around 500,000 cows and responsible for 10% of Argentina's honey production.

Sports
Lincoln Partido is home to a number of football clubs, including; 

 Rivadavia
 El Linqueño
 Argentino de Lincoln
 Juventud Unida de Lincoln
 Atlético de Roberts
 San Martín de Roberts
 Deportivo de Arenaza
 CASET de El Triunfo
 Atlético Las Toscas
 Independiente de Martínez de Hoz
 Deportivo General Pinto
 Pintense de General Pinto
 Atlético de Pasteur.

Folk Festival
Pasteur in Lincoln Partido is home to one of Argentina's most important folk festivals, it takes place in February each year.

External links
 Federal website
 Information about Lincoln Partido
 Provincial Website

1865 establishments in Argentina
Partidos of Buenos Aires Province
Lincoln, Buenos Aires